Víctor Fajardo Province is a province in the centre of the Ayacucho Region in Peru.

Boundaries
North: Cangallo Province
East: Vilcas Huamán Province and Sucre Province
South: Lucanas Province and Huanca Sancos Province
West: Huancavelica Region

Geography 
Other mountains are listed below:

Political division
The province is divided into twelve districts (Spanish: distritos, singular: distrito), each of which is headed by a mayor (alcalde). The districts, with their capitals in parenthesis, are:

 Huancapi (Huancapi), Anexos:Ccocha y Pitahua
 Alcamenca, Anexos: Huambo, Carampa, Mirata, Unya, Eccallo, Patallacta e Irimpay
 Apongo, Anexos: Paire, Chillanccay y Huayccohuasi
 Asquipata, Anexos: Chihuire y Morcolla Chico
 Canaria, Anexos: Raccaya, Taca y Umasi
 Cayara, Anexos: Chincheros y Mayopampa
 Colca, Anexos: Quilla y San José de Sucre
 Huamanquiquia, Anexos: Patará, Tinca y Ucho
 Huancaraylla, Anexos: Circamarca y Llusita
 Huaya, Anexo: Tiquihua
 Sarhua (Sarhua), Anexos: Auquilla, Chuquihuarcaya y Tomanga
 Vilcanchos, Anexos: Cocas, Espite y Urancancha

Ethnic groups 
The people in the province are mainly indigenous citizens of Quechua descent. Quechua is the language which the majority of the population (86.22%) learnt to speak in childhood, 13.42% of the residents started speaking using the Spanish language (2007 Peru Census).

See also 
 Millka
 Ñawpallaqta
 Pukara
 Q'illumayu
 Wamanilla
 Willkamayu

Sources

External links
  Provincia de Victor Fajardo
 Blog

Provinces of the Ayacucho Region